Cristina Cabaña Pérez (born 6 May 1993) is a Spanish judoka.

Introduced to Judo at school in Merida, Spain, ahe trains in Brunete, Spain, with her coach Joaquin Ruiz Llorente. She was selected to compete at the 2020 Summer Games and drawn against Kiyomi Watanabe.

She won the silver medal in the women's 63 kg event at the 2022 Mediterranean Games held in Oran, Algeria.

References

External links
 

Judoka at the 2020 Summer Olympics
Spanish female judoka
1993 births
Living people
Olympic judoka of Spain
European Games competitors for Spain
Judoka at the 2019 European Games
Competitors at the 2022 Mediterranean Games
Mediterranean Games silver medalists for Spain
Mediterranean Games medalists in judo
21st-century Spanish women